Midnight Snack Break at the Poodle Factory is the only album by Punk jazz supergroup Midget Handjob, formed by former Black Flag and Circle Jerks singer Keith Morris. Stylistically, the album combines elements of hardcore punk, jazz, and spoken word. It was released on Epitaph Records on September 26, 2000.

Track listing

References

2000 albums